Ciara Grant may refer to:

 Ciara Grant (footballer, born 1978)
 Ciara Grant (footballer, born 1993)